Two submarines of the United States Navy have been named USS Bonefish, after
the bonefish.

  became lost during World War II.
  became damaged (beyond repair) by a fire at sea in 1988.

References

United States Navy ship names